Ingels is a surname. Notable people with the surname include:

Art Ingels, American racing driver
Bjarke Ingels (born 1974), Danish architect, founder and creative partner of Bjarke Ingels Group
Graham Ingels (1915 1991), American comic book and magazine illustrator
Margaret Ingels (1892–1971), American engineer
Marty Ingels, born Martin Ingerman, (1936–2015), American actor, comedian, comedy sketch writer and theatrical agent
Nick Ingels (born 1984), Belgian road bicycle racer
Ove Ingels (1926–1977), Swedish curler
R. R. Ingels, American politician 
Veerle Ingels (born 1981), Belgian racing cyclist

See also 
Bjarke Ingels Group, Architecture firm of Denmark